Dino Master  is a game for the Nintendo DS system similar to a fusion of Pokémon and the arcade game Qix. The player takes the role of "Dave the Digger", who excavates fossils from various sites while avoiding enemies. The fossils can then be revived into living dinosaurs and pitted against each other in Battle Mode. To battle, the player would choose a part of the dinosaur to defend, and a part of the opponent dinosaur to attack. Smaller dinosaurs are weaker but have less vulnerability points; larger ones are stronger but have more vulnerability points. Powerful dinosaur are more rare to come by, and the player can dispose of the common kinds. In the story mode, the player traces a line across the field and any fossil concealed within the line is revealed. Enemies that collide with the line will send out a yellow "bullet" which will follow the line toward the player until it strikes or the player reaches an area of security. If the player collides with an enemy, the player loses a life. If an enemy is trapped within the line, removed "that enemy is vaporized.

Several errors are in the game, such as the misnaming of dinosaurs. One error is the mislabeling of Plesiosaurus as Plateosaurus.

The game has received poor reviews for errors in the touch-screen functionality and a battle system relying far too heavily on luck.

Characters
Zenjiro
An elderly man who handles Various dinosaurs
Masato
A male youth who handles Fast dinosaurs
Nobuyuki
A researcher who handles Dinosaurs with strong technique
Lucy
A woman who handles Dinosaurs with high HP
Garcia
A gentle giant who handles Aggressive dinosaurs

Dinosaur list
The game includes up to 100 dinosaurs. They mostly consist of carnosaurs, sauropods, pterosaurs and Sea Reptiles. (Pterosaurs and plesiosaurs are considered dinosaurs in the game, although in reality they are not.)

Enemies
There are various enemies in Dino Master. They are mostly large spiders, insects, reptiles and crabs. There is always a "boss" enemy in each level, and if this boss is defeated, the player automatically wins.

Notes

References

2005 video games
Action video games
Dinosaurs in video games
Nintendo DS games
Nintendo DS-only games
Video games developed in Japan